Fløgstad is a surname. Notable people with the surname include:

Kjartan Fløgstad (born 1944), Norwegian author
Kristen Fløgstad (born 1947), Norwegian athlete

See also
Flagstad

Norwegian-language surnames